Lepeda Beach is a beach in the south east of the Paliki, in Kefalonia, Greece.

Character 
The beach is at the end of a length of coast road.

Geology 
The adjacent area is composed of local limestone with a brushwood cover. Homes with beach front access dot the area.

Travel and amenities 

A short, steep, well-made road leads down to the beach area. The beach has a single small shop selling drinks. It is possible to hire a sunshade. A volleyball net is often in place. Many people try and park on the steep road, however, going right to the bottom of the incline and turning left immediately in front of the small shop leads down a road to a larger car park area.

References

Beaches of Greece
Bays of Greece
Tourist attractions in the Ionian Islands (region)
Landforms of Cephalonia
Landforms of the Ionian Islands (region)